Pierre-François Forissier (born 29 December 1951, Lorient) is a notable French Admiral Submariner and former Chief of Staff of the French Navy, a post which he took up, on February 4, 2008 and left on September 12, 2011.

Biography

After studying his secondary education in Nice, Marseille and Toulon, he then attended a Lycée naval at Brest (1968–1971).

He married Brigitte Desbrest on 24 June 1978 at Bonnetan, and have four children.

Military career 

Pierre-François entered the École Navale (1971–1974). Upon completing his chartered course, he graduated as an enseigne de vaisseau de première classe and rallied to the French Submarine Forces FSM in 1975. He served on all types of operational submarines, notably commanding the nuclear attack submarine SNA Rubis and the ballistic missile submarine SNLE Tonnant.

In 1974, he served on the 20th minesweepers surface division and the minesweeper Glycine as second officer in command, then in 1990 as a manoeuvring-officer of the carrier Foch.

In 1993, he was designated as second in command of the Brest Naval Training Centre.

He served also at the general staff headquarters of the French Navy in the « Material » division, the a couple years later in the « Plans » division and was promoted to Contre-Amiral (Counter-Admiral) in 2001.

He then occupied the functions of territorial assistant to the commandant of the coded maritime region « Atlantic ».

Vice-Amiral (Vice-Admiral), he commanded the Submarines Forces FSM and Force Océanique Stratégique FOST before being designated as a Vice-Amiral d'Escadre (Squadron Vice-Admiral) deputy in 2005 at the post of Major Général de La Marine.

On November 4, 2008, he was elevated to the rank of Amiral (Admiral) and designated as Chief of Staff of the French Navy. He left that command function on September 12, 2011 and was replaced by Amiral Bernard Rogel.

Decorations and medals

 Grand Officer of the Order of the Legion of Honour
 Knight of the National Order of Merit
 Commander of the Order of Maritime Merit
 Medaille de la Défense Nationale (silver echelon)
 Gold Honor Cross of the Bundeswehr (Germany)
 Commander of the Legion of Merit (United States)
 Grand Cross with Swords pro Merito Melitensi (Order of Malta)
 Grand Officer of the Order of Naval Merit (Brazil)
 Grand Cross of the Order of Rio Branco (Brazil)

Gallery

See also 

Édouard Guillaud
Christophe Prazuck
List of submarines of France

Notes and references

External links
 Biography of admiral Forissier on the French Navy site

1951 births
Living people
Military personnel from Lorient
Commandeurs of the Légion d'honneur
Chiefs of Staff of the French Navy
École Navale alumni
Knights of the Ordre national du Mérite
Commanders of the Legion of Merit
Recipients of the Order of Naval Merit (Brazil)
Recipients of the Order pro Merito Melitensi